The Hong Sang Eo (Red Shark) torpedo (Hangul: 홍상어 어뢰), also called the K-ASROC, is a vertically launched anti-submarine missile successively developed and tested by South Korea's University of Science and Technology, the Korea Agency for Defense Development (ADD) and the Republic of Korea Navy in 2009. After release, the Blue Shark independently searches for the target.

The missiles are planned to be deployed on KDX-II and KDX-III destroyers starting in 2010. Each destroyer will carry between 8 (KDX-II) and 16 (KDX-III) of the missiles. The development cost of the program was around US$ 80 million, with a production cost of about $14 million. They were designed in order to combat the potential threat of North Korean submarines.

Ships
The Red Shark missiles are fitted to the following ship classes

 Chungmugong Yi Sun-sin class destroyer (KDX-II)
 King Sejong the Great class destroyer (KDX-III)

See also 
 List of military equipment of Republic of Korea (section Torpedo/Anti-submarine)
 List of missiles by country 
 List of naval weapon systems (section K)
 List of torpedoes by name
 Republic of Korea Navy (section Korean Destroyer Experimental (KDX) program)

References  

Post–Cold War weapons of South Korea
Naval weapons of South Korea
Anti-submarine missiles